is a 2019 Japanese film adaptation of the anime series of the same name by Takahiro Omori. It is directed by Kōji Shiraishi and distributed by GAGA Pictures and Constantin Film. It was released on November 15, 2019.

Plot
In 1965, a teenage girl uses the Hell Correspondence to contact Ai Enma, the Hell Girl, a mysterious figure who can send someone who you have a grudge against to Hell in exchange for forfeiting your own soul to Hell once you die. She sends a girl who has bullied her to Hell, but shows regret. Ai tells her that there's no point, as it is already done. In 2019, that same girl, now aged and ill, has told her journalist son, Jin Kudo, her story right before she dies. He then publishes the story.

High schooler Miho Ichikawa attends a concert by Maki, a charismatic rising musician, where she is groped by a pervert. Another girl, Haruka Nanjo, who is obsessed with Maki, saves her and the two become close friends. Miho skips school to go with Haruka to a concert by Sanae Mikuriya, a popstar. During the concert, a man jumps on the stage and slashes Sanae's face with a knife. Kudo and Maki, who were in attendance, detain him. Sanae is taken home and becomes distraught after seeing the scars on her face. She comes across Kudo's article, and at midnight, goes to the Hell Correspondence site and types in the name of her attacker, Nagaoka Takuro. She sees a vision of Hell, and meets Ai, who gives her a straw doll with a red thread tied around it. She is told that once the thread is untied, Nagaoka will be sent to Hell, but when she dies, Sanae will also go to Hell.

Sanae meets with Kudo to discuss the Hell Correspondence, and he advises her to not pull the thread, and to move on with her life. However, pushed over the edge by a cruel letter from Nagaoka, Sanae pulls the thread in front of Kudo, and the doll dissolves. Nagaoka is dragged to Hell. His mother goes to the Mikuriya residence to beg forgiveness. Sanae tells her that she sent her son to Hell, and resumes her singing career with Maki as her manager.

During Sanae's performance, Ai appears before Sanae and says she must take her to Hell. She explains to the confused Sanae that Nagaoka's mother had put her name in Hell Correspondence and has just pulled the thread. Later, Nagaoka's mother visits Sanae's parents and commits suicide.

After Sanae's disappearance, Maki held an audition to replace Sanae. He chose Haruka as the new soloist. He made Haruka eat the drugs he is taking called "candies" then they kissed. Afterwards, Haruka meet with Miho who is still waiting for her after the auditions however Maki told her to stay away from Haruka since she is not pure.

One day, Miho goes to Haruka's residence wherein she saw that Maki drove Haruka home and they kissed before he leaves. Haruka entered her home and beat her mother. Bothered by the noise Miho decided to knock on the door. Haruka's mother opened it and Miho saw Haruka's mother bruised faced. Haruka showed up and beats Miho and told her to stay away from her.

Distraught Miho walks home thinking Haruka is being brainwashed by Maki. She goes to Kudo's apartment to find more information about Maki. Kudo confirmed that Maki is a dangerous man. He gives "candies" to everyone around him. Also, Kudo played a voice recorder wherein Maki is having a conversation with his henchman about killing Haruka during the live performance as a sacrifice to cleanse the world.

The next day, Kudo and Miho kidnaps Haruka and told her about the sacrifice. After being released, Haruka goes straight to Maki's house. She told him that Kudo knows about the drugs and the sacrifice without mentioning Miho is in it.

Kudo placed a bug in Haruka's bag and hears everything. Before he can send a text message to Miho that Haruka knows about the sacrifice, one of Maki's henchman knocked him out.

When he wakes up, he was in an abandoned building with Maki. Maki stabs Kudo, killing him. The next day, while Miho is having breakfast she hears about Kudo's murder and decided to access the Hell link by midnight to send Maki to hell.

Miho attended the concert and pulls the string of the doll sealing the contract with Hell Girl. Hell girl appears and sends Maki to hell. Miho jumped in the stage before the metal block collapsed, saving Haruka while Maki disappears.

Haruka and Miho reconcile and become friends again. Around the same time, Maki's disappearance and his true colors was finally revealed on publics. Causing both Maki's album and single's sales dropped rapidly and his men later arrested to the police thanks Kudo's testimony before his death.

Cast
 Tina Tamashiro as Ai Enma
 Manami Hashimoto as Hone Onna
 Akaji Maro as Wanyūdō
 Raiku as Ren 'Roby' Ichimoku
 Nana Mori as Miho Ichikawa
 Sawa Nimura as Haruka Nanjo
 Mina Ōba as Sanae Mikuriya
 Kazuki Namioka as Kudo
 Tom Fujita as Maki

References

External links
 
  

2019 films
CJ Entertainment films
Constantin Film films
Japanese fantasy films
Japanese horror films
2010s Japanese films
2010s Japanese-language films
Live-action films based on manga